= Padhana Gujar =

- Town
- Location within Pakistan
- Coordinates: 33.17°N 73.21°E
- Country: Pakistan
- Province: (Islamabad Capital Territory) Islamabad C.T
- Elevation: 480 m (1,570 ft)

Population
  - Total: 117,535
- Time zone: UTC+5 (PST)

Padhana Gujar is a town in the Islamabad Capital Territory of Pakistan. It is located at 33° 17' 40N 73° 21' 35E with an altitude of 480 metres (1578 feet).
